This is a list of Valmet products. The Valmet Corporation is a developer and supplier of technologies, automation systems and services for the pulp, paper and energy industries but Valmet's history as an industrial operator stretches back over 200 years. This list concentrates mainly on the historical products while the new products are described in the main article.

Historical Valmet products

Rail vehicles 
Between 1958 and 1991 Valmet produced a large number of locomotives, diesel multiple units and electric multiple units for the Finnish State Railways, as well as a number of trams for Helsinki City Transport.

Locomotives 

Diesel locomotives – Valmet made first locomotives in co-operation with Lokomo and Tampella for USSR and after that locomotives for the VR Group.

 VR Class Hr11
 VR Class Dv11
 VR Class Dv12
 VR Class Dv15
 VR Class Dv16
 VR Class Dr12
 VR Class Dr16
 VR Class Tve4

Diesel multiple units 
Diesel trains and railbuses (Dm3 ja Dm4, Dm6 ja Dm7, Dm8, Dm9)
 VR Class Dm6
 VR Class Dm7
 VR Class Dm8
 VR Class Dm9

Electric multiple units 
Valmet made electrical multiple units with Strömberg for VR (Sm1 and Sm2, and for Helsinki metro M100 trains).

Trams 
Valmet made trams with Strömberg for HKL years 1973–1975 and 1983–1987.
 Valmet RM 1
 Valmet RM 2
 Valmet RM 3
 Valmet Nr I
 Valmet Nr II

Other
 Cmc, Rt, Pot, Nom

Airplane industry 
Valmet's first airplane products came from Valtion lentokonetehdas. Valmet designed and made the Valmet L-70 Vinka and Valmet L-90 Redigo military trainer aircraft for the Finnish Air Force. It also designed the Tuuli III and L-89 Turbovinha. It also had a license to make Fouga Magister, Saab Draken and BAe Hawk.

The products were later moved to Patria Finavitec Oy and Patria company's Patria Aviation Oy.

Aerospace 
Valmet's main tasks were the assembly and licence production of Fouga Magister trainers, Saab Draken fighters and BAe Hawk trainers. The Tampere factory was closed in the 1960s and main part of the aircraft factory became the facility at Kuorevesi.

Domestically designed aircraft included the Valmet Vihuri in the 1950s, the Valmet Vinka in the late 1970s, and the Valmet Redigo in the mid-1980s.

After the Finnish state privatized Valmet in 1996, the aviation division was detached and integrated into Finnish defense industries, Patria, as Patria Finavitec. The military part is mostly state-owned but EADS owns 27 per cent of Patria.

This period started with the assembly of F/A-18 Hornet fighter aircraft and NH90 helicopters. Civilian work increased in the form of participating in design and manufacture of parts for Airbus aircraft, most notably A380 spoilers.

Airplanes 
Valmet Tuuli II
Valmet Vihuri
Valmet Vinka
Valmet L-90 TP Redigo

Saab-Valmet 
In 1968 Valmet and Saab started a company called Saab-Valmet. It had a car factory in Uusikaupunki and it produced mainly Saab cars, although Talbots were also built. The factory is now Valmet Automotive.

Paper mills 
Valmet made paper mill machinery and process control equipment. Valtion tykkitehdas produced artillery pieces for the Finnish Army along with Tampella AB industries. After World War II production switched to paper mills.

Paper machines production technology was made in Rautpohja fun factory by Uolevi Konttinen, Olavi Miekk-oja and a technician.  Unlike for many other gun factories it was easier for Valmet to change their products.  The first two paper machines were made for Metalexport to Poland in 1953.  In 1969 it made an agreement to make paper and cardboard machines with Tampella and Wärtsilä.

Valmet concentrated to make paper machines for making paper for newspapers, magazines and bags. The companies had a common marketing organization.

Metso Paper had a company in China's Xi'an with a local partner. The company was called Metso Paper Technology (Xi'an) Co. Ltd. It is now called Valmet Paper Technology (Xi'an) Co. Ltd.

Tractors 

Valmet first made tractors for Finland. In the beginning of 1960's Valmet made a tractor factory to Brazil and later one in Tanzania. Valmet took over Volvo BM's tractor production in the 1980s. In 1994 Valmet sold the Valmet (tractor) to Sisu Auto which Partek bought in 1997. Partek came part of Kone in 2002. It sold the tractors to AGCO Corporation. The company makes tractors in Äänekoski's Suolahti factory. In 2001 they took Valtra trademark into use. Originally Valtra was a product name of Valmet's products.

Forestry machines

Valmet's machines for forestry were also moved from Sisu Auto, Partek and Kone. Kone sold them to Japanese Komatsu in 2003. Komatsu Forest makes forest machines in Sweden and United States and discontinued the Valmet labelled products in the beginning of 2011.

Instruments 

 Sauna thermometers
 Electronical instruments, first made in Enermet Oy, which is now part of Landis+Gyr
 Valmet clocks were made in 1950's and 1960's. There were 10 different models, e.g. Matti and Jussi.

Machines for building houses 
 Kiuas
 Super fans
 Elevators used by industry and individuals. Valmet started to make elevators in 1953. After making 150 elevators it started co-operation with Swiss Schlieren company. They made Valmet-Schlieren elevators in 1959–1980. After that is made elevators alone until 1986. Together with American Otis Elevator company a new company calle Valmet Otis was formed in 1986. Otis owned 70% and Valmet 30% but in 1992 Valmet sold them.

Weapons 

Valtion Kivääritehdas was merged into Valmet in 1951. The firearms developed by Valmet include the Rk 62, mod. 78 7.62×51, M82 and the RK 95 TP.

 Guns for army: Valmet Rk 62, Rk 76, M82 assault rifles and TAK 75 and 85 rifles
 Guns for hunting and sport: Suomen Leijona, Valmet Erä and Valmet Orava rifles,  Valmet Leijona, Valmet 112, Valmet 212, Valmet 312 and Valmet 412 shotguns and RK 62-based Valmet Petra rifle.

Trolleybuses 
The company also manufactured trolleybuses, between 1948 and 1960, but the total number built was only 52, comprising 23 for Helsinki and 29 for Tampere.

Shipyards 
Valmet dockyards were merged with Wärtsilä yards to form Wärtsilä Marine. After the bankruptcy the company re-emerged as Masa Yards, later becoming Aker Finnyards and subsequently Aker Yards.
  was built at the Vuosaari shipyard in Helsinki.

Other products 
 Valmet made Terhi outdoor motors in Jyskä factory in 1959–1979.
 Snowmobiles Valmet made Lynx, Terhi and Winha snowmobiles in 1970's and 1980's.

References

Valmet products
Valmet products
Products